Greenwood is a rural locality in the Toowoomba Region, Queensland, Australia.

Geography 
The land is freehold and use for agriculture, predominantly cropping.

The Oakey–Cooyar Road runs through the north-western corner.

History 
The first Evangelical Lutheran Church in Queensland opened at Greenwood circa 1900. However, the Greenwood congregation outgrew the building so it was relocated to Yamsion to become its Evangelican Lutheran Church, where it was officially opened and dedicated on Thursday 18 May 1922.

Greenwood Provisional School opened on 1907. On 1 January 1909, it became Greenwood State School. It closed in 1968. It was at 1091 Oakey Cooyar Road.

Greenwood Methodist Church opened on 5 April 1959 at the top of the hill on Oakey-Cooyar Road, becoming the Greenwood Uniting Church after the 1977 amalgamation which formed the Uniting Church in Australia. In 1979, the Greenwood church building was relocated to Goombungee to become the Goombungee Uniting Church, while the former Goombungee Uniting Church became the church hall. On 26 August 2012, the former Greenwood church in Goombungee was decommissioned as a church and sold into private ownership.

References

Further reading 

  — includes Gowrie Little Plains School, Aubigny School, Crosshill School, Devon Park State School, Silverleigh State School, Boodua School, Greenwood State School, Kelvinhaugh State School

Toowoomba Region
Localities in Queensland